The Watchtower of Venturada (Spanish: Atalaya de Venturada) is a watchtower located in Venturada, Spain. It was declared Bien de Interés Cultural in 1983.

References 

Towers in Spain
Venturada
Castles in the Community of Madrid
Bien de Interés Cultural landmarks in the Community of Madrid